Mihai Rădulescu (May 15, 1936 in Bucharest – January 20, 2009 in Bucharest) was a Romanian novelist, poet, historian and art critic.

In November 1956, while he was a second year student at the School of English Studies, Department of Letters, University of Bucharest, he was  arrested for participating in a political protest, and sentenced to 4 years of imprisonment, which he spent at Jilava, Gherla, Periprava, Salcia, and Luciu-Giurgeni. In 1963, he restarted his studies, graduating from the same School of English Studies of the University of Bucharest. He then became a high school teacher, a junior lecturer at his alma mater, and, from 1979 a lecturer in English and French at the Theological Institute in Bucharest.

After the Romanian Revolution of 1989, he started the publishing company "Ramida".

Books

Capcanele vocabularului englez - Andrei Bantaș and Mihai Rădulescu, Editura Stiințifică, 1967
Violonistica enesciana: violonistul Enescu: creația enesciană pentru vioară, Editura Muzicală, 1971
Finaluri complexe în șah: arta marilor campioni, Editura Stadion, 1972  
Shakespeare – un psiholog modern, Albatros, 1979
Educația prin muncă a elevilor: schițe pedagogice, Editura Didactică si Pedagogică, 1981
Civilizația armenilor, Editura Sport-Turism, 1983 
Stilistica spectacolului: elemente de stilistică antropologică în teatru, Editura Junimea, 1985 
Mozart: șapte zile pentru nemurire, Editura Muzicală, 1987 
O vizită la Regele Mihai I, Editura Semnalul, 1990
Pe bulevard in jos: schițe și nuvele, Editura Literă, 1990 
False friends - Andrei Bantaș and Mihai Rădulescu, Editura Teora, 1992
Tragedia lui Lucrețiu Pătrășcanu: convorbiri cu omul politic Corneliu Coposu, Editura Ramida, 1992
Sânge pe Râul Doamnei: Până când atâta suferință?, Editura Ramida, 1992
Caidul: nuvelele adolescenței în temnițele comuniste, Editura Ramida, 1992
Dactilografele și revoluția, Editura Ramida, 1993
Casa lacrimilor neplânse: martor al acuzării in procesul "reeducatorilor", Editura Ramida, 1993
Ion Mihalache: În infruntare cu Carol II, Editura Ramida, 1993
Rugul Aprins. Duhovnicii Ortodoxiei, sub lespezi, în gherlele comuniste, Editura Ramida, 1993
Împușcarea călărețului, Editura Ramida, 1994
Martiriul Bisericii Ortodoxe Romane, Editura Ramida, 1994 
Codrul scufundat: la 50 ani de la moartea lui Liviu Rebreanu, Editura Ramida, 1994
Evadarea lui Liviu Rebreanu, Editura Ramida, 1994
Popa Piso din Zărnești, Editura Ramida, 1994
Condamnat să învingă, Editura Ramida, 1995
Antropologia stilistică: lumea lui Charles Dickens, Editura Ramida, 1995
Flăcări sub cruce, Editura Ramida, 1995
Testament între înger și diavol, Editura Ramida, 1995
Un viitor călugăr greco-catolic din preajma „Rugului aprins; în colaborare cu Pericle Martinescu și Justin Paven), Editura Ramida, 1996
Alcovul secret" din volumul de povestiri: "Decameronul din Nowhershire, sub pseudonimul Alquain Foggrery (publicat la Editura F.F.Press, într-o primă editie, 1996; a doua aparitie la Editura Ramida)
Haiku-urile putrezirii de viu, Editura Ramida, 1996
Dubla personalitate în Renaștere: studiu monografic de antropologie stilistică, Editura Ramida, 1996
Mortii nostri vii din temnite. Sonete, Editura Ramida, 1997
Preoți în cătușe, în colaborare cu Irineu Slătineanu, Editura Ramida, 1997
Antim Ivireanul: învatator, scriitor, personaj, Fundatia "Antim Ivireanul", 1997
Rugul Aprins de la Mănăstirea Antim la Aiud, Editura Ramida, 1998
Patru eseuri despre Mircea Eliade, Editura Ramida, 1998
Istoria literaturii române de detenție: Vol. 1 - Memorialistica reeducarilor; Vol. 2 - Marturisirea colaborării, Editura Ramida, 1998
Morala practica pentru crestinul incepător, Editura Ramida, 1999
Bucuriile și mâhnirile părintelui Sisoe din Boteni, Editura Ramida, 1999	
, 1999
Iubirea ca pasărea cerului și alte povestiri, Editura Ramida, 1999	
Genealogia romanească. Istoric si bibliografie, Editura Istros - Muzeul Brailei, 2000 
Memorie si stramosi, Editura Albatros, 2002 
Chemarea lui Dumnezeu în temnițele comuniste. Vol. I, Editura Agapis, 2002
Hrandt, Editura Ararat, 2002
Intemnitarea Parintelui Nicodim, Editura Agapis, 2003 
Însemnări pe “Calendarul meu” de Radu Gyr, Fundația Prof. George Manu, 2003
Rugul Aprins. Arestare. Condamnare. Achitare, Editura Agapis, 2003
Chemarea lui Dumnezeu în temnițele comuniste. Vol. II, Editura Agapis, 2004
La capatul iadului: mãrturii si documente, Editura Vremea, 2005
Sandu Tudor și "Floarea de foc", Editura Panaghia, 2008
, 2008
Hiroshige,	Editura Maiko, 2008
Calea cărtii. Povestiri din viata Părintelui Nicodim Mandita, Editura Agapis, 2015

References

External links
NordLitera article 

1936 births
2009 deaths
Writers from Bucharest
Romanian art critics
20th-century Romanian historians
Romanian male novelists
Romanian male poets
Romanian prisoners and detainees
Eastern Orthodox Christians from Romania
20th-century Romanian poets
20th-century Romanian novelists
20th-century Romanian male writers
University of Bucharest alumni
Inmates of Gherla prison